This is an inclusive list of science fiction television programs whose names begin with the letter D.

D
Live-action
Dans une galaxie près de chez vous a.k.a. In a galaxy near you (1998–2001, Canada)
Dark (2017-2020, Germany)
Daredevil (2015–2018)
Dark Angel (2000–2002)
Dark Matter (2015–2017, Canada)
Dark Realm (2001, anthology)
Dark Season (1991, UK)
Dark Side of the Sun, The (1983, UK)
Dark Skies (1996–1997)
Darkroom (1981–1982, anthology)
Day After, The (1983, film)
Day After Tomorrow, The a.k.a. Into Infinity (1975, UK, special)
Day Break (2006–2008)
Day of the Triffids, The (franchise):
Day of the Triffids, The (1981, UK, miniseries)
Day of the Triffids, The (2009, UK, miniseries)
Dead at 21 (1994)
Dead Man's Gun (1997–1999, anthology) (elements of science fiction in some episodes)
Dead Zone, The (2002–2007)
Deadly Earnest a.k.a. Deadly Earnest's Awful Movies (1966–1972, Australia)
Deadly Games (1995–1997)
Debris (2021)
Defiance (2013–2015)
Defying Gravity (2009)
Denkou Choujin Gridman (1993–1994, Japan)
Dennō Coil (2007)
Dennou Keisatsu Cybercop (1988–1989, Japan)
Dick Spanner, P.I. (1986–1987, UK, stop-motion animation)
Dimension 404 (2017, anthology)
Dimensions of Fear (1963, UK) IMDb
Dinosapien (2007, UK/Canada)
Dinotopia (franchise):
Dinotopia (2002, miniseries)
Dinotopia (2002–2003)
Disneyland a.k.a. Wonderful World of Disney, The (1954–2008, anthology) (elements of science fiction in some episodes)
Do Over (2002)
Doctor Who (franchise):
Doctor Who (1963–1989, 1996, 2005–present, UK)
K-9 and Company (1981, UK, Doctor Who spin-off, pilot)
A Fix with Sontarans (1985, UK, segment)
Dimensions in Time (1993, UK, special, crossover)
P.R.O.B.E. (1994–1996, UK, Doctor Who spin-offs, films):
Zero Imperative, The (1994, UK, Doctor Who spin-off, film)
Devil of Winterborne, The (1995, UK, Doctor Who spin-off, film)
Unnatural Selection (1996, UK, Doctor Who spin-off, film)
Ghosts of Winterborne (1996, UK, Doctor Who spin-off, film)
Doctor Who and the Curse of Fatal Death a.k.a. The Curse of Fatal Death (1999, UK, special)
Doctor Who: Children in Need a.k.a. Born Again (2005, UK, special)
Attack of the Graske (2005, UK, interactive mini-episode)
Torchwood (2006–2011, UK, Doctor Who spin-off):
Torchwood: Children of Earth (2009, miniseries, third season)
Torchwood: Miracle Day (2011, fourth season)
Totally Doctor Who (2006–2007, UK)
Sarah Jane Adventures, The (2007–2011, UK, Doctor Who spin-off)
Time Crash (2007, UK, mini-episode)
Music of the Spheres (2009, UK, mini-episode)
Doctor Who: Tonight's the Night (2009, UK, special)
K-9 (2009–2010, UK/Australia, Doctor Who spin-off)
Class (2016, UK, Doctor Who spin-off)
Dollhouse (2009–2010)
Doom Runners (1997, Australia, film)
Doomwatch (1970–1972, UK)

Animated
D.Gray-man (2006–2008, Japan, animated)
Dallas & Robo (2018, animated)
Dan Dare: Pilot of the Future (2001, UK, animated)
Dan Vs. (2011–2013, animated) (elements of science fiction in some episodes)
Danball Senki (franchise):
Danball Senki a.k.a. Cardboard Chronicles (2011–2012, Japan, animated)
Danball Senki W (Dabaru) a.k.a. Cardboard Chronicles W (Double) (2012–2013, Japan, animated)
Danball Senki Wars (2013, Japan, animated)
Dancouga – Super Beast Machine God (1985, Japan, animated)
Darkstalkers (1995, animated) Epguides IMDb (elements of science fiction)
Darkwing Duck (1991–1992, animated) (elements of science fiction in some episodes)
DC Nation Shorts (2012, shorts, animated)
Defenders of the Earth (1986–1987, animated)
Delilah and Julius (2005–2008, Canada, animated, elements of science fiction)
Delta State (2004–2006, France/Canada, animated) IMDb
Desert Punk (2004–2005, Japan, animated)
Dex Hamilton: Alien Entomologist (2007, Canada/Australia/UK, animated)
Dexter's Laboratory (franchise):
Dexter's Laboratory a.k.a. Dexter's Lab (1996–2003, animated)
Dial M for Monkey (1996–1999, Dexter's Laboratory backup segment, animated)
Justice Friends, The (1996–1998, Dexter's Laboratory backup segment, animated)
Di-Gata Defenders (2006–2008, Canada, animated) (elements of science fiction)
Dino-Riders (1988, animated)
Dinosaucers (1987, animated)
Dinosaur King (franchise):
Dinosaur King a.k.a. Ancient Ruler Dinosaur King DKidz Adventure (2007–2008, Japan, animated)
Ancient Ruler Dinosaur King DKidz Adventure: Pterosaur Legend (2008, Japan, animated)
Dinosaur War Izenborg (1977–1978, Japan, animated)
DinoSquad (2007–2008, animated)
Dirty Pair (1985, Japan, animated)
Disney's Fluppy Dogs (1986, special, animated)
DNA² (1994, Japan, animated)
Doctor Who (franchise):
Doctor Who: The Infinite Quest (2007, UK, animated)
Doctor Who: Dreamland (2009, UK, animated)
Doraemon (franchise):
Doraemon (1973, Japan, animated)
Doraemon (1979–2005, Japan, animated)
Doraemon (2005–present, Japan, animated)
Dork Hunters from Outer Space (2008–2009, UK/Germany, animated) IMDb
Dr. Slump (franchise):
Dr. Slump – Arale-chan (1981–1986, Japan, animated)
Doctor Slump (1997–1999, Japan, animated)
Dragon Ball (franchise):
Dragon Ball (1986–1989, Japan, animated)
Dragon Ball Z a.k.a. DBZ (1989–1996, Japan, animated)
Dragon Ball Z: Bardock – The Father of Goku (1990, Japan, special, animated)
Dragon Ball Z: The History of Trunks (1993, Japan, special, animated)
Dragon Ball GT a.k.a. Dragon Ball G(rand) T(our) (1996–1997, Japan, animated)
Dragon Ball GT: A Hero's Legacy (1997, Japan, special, animated)
Dragon Ball Z Kai (2009–2015, Japan, animated)
Dragon Booster (2004–2006, Canada, animated)
Dragon Drive (2002–2003, Japan, animated)
Dragon Flyz (1996–1997, France, animated)
Dragonaut: The Resonance (2007–2008, Japan, animated)
Duck Dodgers (2003–2006, animated)

References

Television programs, D